Maurice F. Donegan (September 2, 1875 – March 24, 1950) was a justice of the Iowa Supreme Court from January 1, 1933, to December 31, 1938, appointed from Scott County, Iowa.

References

External links

Justices of the Iowa Supreme Court
1875 births
1950 deaths